Grange Barn is a historic timber-framed building in Coggeshall, Essex, England. Grange Barn was built by the Cistercians in the 13th century to serve Coggeshall Abbey. It underwent significant structural alteration in the 14th century.  It is Grade I listed.

The barn is 36.57 metres long, 13.71 metres wide and 10.67 metres high. For comparison, England's largest medieval barn, Harmondsworth Great Barn, is 58.55 metres long, 11.3 metres wide, and 11.9 metres high. The barn has a nave and two aisles. There are two midstreys (gabled porches) which would have provided access for wagons: these are 18th century.

History 
Coggeshall Abbey was about a quarter of a mile away. Most of its buildings have not survived, but despite the dissolution of the Abbey in the 1530s, the barn remained in continual agricultural use up until 1960 when it was left derelict.

Conservation 
Grance Barn was listed, and in 1982 it was compulsorily purchased by Braintree District Council, after pressure from a local group which also initiated the restoration of the building, the work being completed in 1985. The restoration received a Europa Nostra award.
In 1989 the barn was given to the National Trust for its future preservation.
The intention is to present the structure as it was in the 14th century.

Access 
Grange Barn is open to the public with a display explaining the history of the Barn, as well as a collection of woodworking tools used by a local craftsman. It is available to hire for special events.

References

External links 

 Official website

13th-century architecture in the United Kingdom
 Grade I listed barns
Grade I listed buildings in Essex
National Trust properties in Essex
Timber framed buildings in Essex
Wooden buildings and structures in the United Kingdom
Coggeshall